Naughty @ 40 (also known as/earlier titled as Excuse Me Please) is a 2011 Hindi adult comedy film directed by Jagmohan Mundhra, while produced by Anuj Sharma under Gangani Multimedia Corporations and also distributed by Srishti Creations.

The film stars Govinda and Yuvika Chaudhary in the lead roles, with Anupam Kher, Gurpreet Ghuggi, Shakti Kapoor, Sanjai Mishra and Smita Jaykar in supporting roles. The film is a remake of the 2005 Judd Apatow buddy film, The 40-Year Old Virgin.

Plot
Harvinder (Govinda) is a 40-year-old man living in London with his parents Laxminarayan Srivastav (Anupam Kher) and Maya Srivastav (Smita Jaykar), an ardent lover of the lord. He's still a virgin and sleepwalks in the nights. One night he sleepwalks into an unknown white woman's bedroom causing mayhem for her lover until the white woman's husband shows up. Sanjeev's father seeks the help of his employee Shafarat Ali (Shakti Kapoor) and his nephews to help Sanjeev lose his virginity, but all their efforts are futile. This brings embarrassment to LM Kapoor.

Happy's friends attempt to hook him up where one of his friends talks to a Chinese girl who then leads Happy to her room. However, much to the dismay of Happy, he discovers "she" is a man.
The next day, Randy, Sandy and Shafarat Ali leads Happy to the massage parlour. Happy then accidentally breaks the female massage parlour's nose. In a fit of fear, they break into a run. LM Kapoor then invites Happy to Uncle Chatur's (Sanjay Mishra) house, who is a heart patient, where Happy is head over heals over his daughter however one night, Happy ends causing trouble for another woman due to sleeping on her bed. Because of his sleep-walking problem, girls reject him.

The family leaves for Manali, where Sanjeev marries Gauri (Yuvika Chaudhary), a girl much younger than him. However, Gauri is up to childish pranks all the while, which results in Sanjeev getting into a physical relationship with a London-based model who is in the town for photo shoot. Sanjeev thinks nobody will find out, but when Gauri does discover the truth, she gets a rude shock, which brings about a change in her attitude.

Cast
 Govinda as Harvinder Srivastav (Happy Brother)
 Yuvika Chaudhary as Gauri Bahl
 Anupam Kher as Laxminarayan 'Allan' Srivastav (LM Kapoor)
 Shakti Kapoor as Sharafat Ali
 Smita Jaykar as Maya L. Srivastav
 Harish Kumar as Sandeep / Sandy (Sanjeev's cousin)
 Sanjai Mishra as Sanjeev's uncle
 Sayali Bhagat as Woman who rejects Sanjeev
 Rakesh Bedi as Dayashankar (Gauri's father)
 Gurpreet Ghuggi as Laxminarayan's employee
 Satwant Kaur as Sayali's mother
 Sudesh Lehri

Soundtrack
The album consists of four tracks and was released on Venus music label.

Controversy
The movie's release was delayed for over two years when the producers Anuj Sharma and Sandeep Kapoor had a fall out. Kapoor approached the Delhi High Court in 2009 seeking recovery of a loan of  1.32 crore which he had allegedly advanced to Sharma. Justice V.K. Jain allowed Sharma to go ahead with the film's release after his lawyer deposited a demand draft of  1 crore with the court registry. However, the court declined Kapoor's plea to release the amount to him stating "The question of release of money to the petitioner (Kapoor) would be decided after the entire amount is deposited with the court". He also asked Sharma to pay the remaining amount by 6 April 2011.

Reception
Naughty @ 40 opened to mixed reviews from critics. Taran Adarsh of Bollywood Hungama rated the film with two stars out of five saying, "The film is for the hardcore masses who relish double entendres and saucy jokes." Rajeev Masand of CNN-IBN gave the film three stars out of 5 and stated, "Naughty @ 40 is a non-stop laughathon." Anupama Chopra of NDTV gave two and a half stars and commented, "Looked really good with all the trailers, but turned out as one of those rare films that barely get anything right!" Nikhat Kazmi of the Times of India awarded two and a half stars saying, "You have a film that can be an average weekend getaway. Nothing more, not even the plot of the laugh riot The 40-Year-old Virgin."

References

External links 

 

2011 films
2010s Hindi-language films
2010s sex comedy films
2011 romantic comedy films
Indian romantic comedy films
Indian sex comedy films
Indian remakes of American films
Films directed by Jag Mundhra